Phagnalon rupestre is a species of shrub in the family Asteraceae. They have a self-supporting growth form, simple, broad leaves and dry fruit. Individuals can grow to 0.25 m.

Sources

References 

Gnaphalieae
Flora of Malta